David William Fairbank (born December 19, 1954) is an American former swimmer, Olympic champion, and former world record-holder.  Fairbank represented the United States at the 1972 Summer Olympics in Munich, Germany.  He swam for the winning U.S. teams in the preliminary heats of the men's 4×100-meter freestyle relay and 4×100-meter medley relay, but did not receive a medal for either event.  Under the Olympic rules in effect in 1972, swimmers who competed in the qualifying heats, but not the final of relay events, were not eligible to receive a medal.

See also
 List of Stanford University people
 World record progression 4 × 100 metres freestyle relay

References

1954 births
Living people
American male freestyle swimmers
World record setters in swimming
Sportspeople from Sacramento, California
Stanford Cardinal men's swimmers
Swimmers at the 1972 Summer Olympics
Olympic swimmers of the United States